Andréanne Langlois (born April 1, 1993) is a Canadian sprint kayaker. She is the current Pan American Games champion in the women's K-2 500 m with Alanna Bray-Lougheed, as well as in the K-4 500 metres. She also added two individual Pan American Games silvers in 2019 in both the K-1 200 m, and K-1 500 m. Langlois competed as part of Canada's Olympic team at 2016 Rio Olympics.

In March 2021, Langlois was named to Canada's 2020 Olympic team.

References

1993 births
Canadian female canoeists
Living people
Sportspeople from Quebec City
Canoeists at the 2016 Summer Olympics
Canoeists at the 2020 Summer Olympics
Canoeists at the 2019 Pan American Games
Olympic canoeists of Canada
Université Laval alumni
Pan American Games medalists in canoeing
Pan American Games gold medalists for Canada
Pan American Games silver medalists for Canada
Medalists at the 2019 Pan American Games
20th-century Canadian women
21st-century Canadian women
ICF Canoe Sprint World Championships medalists in kayak